Peel Island (formerly known as Montague Island or the Gridiron) is one of the three islands of Coniston Water in the English Lake District, Cumbria. The two others are Fir Island (which is connected to the shore unless the water is particularly high) and Oak Island. It is most famous for being one of the inspirations for Arthur Ransome's Wild Cat Island. Today, it is a popular tourist destination, and belongs to the National Trust.

History

Wild Cat Island
Peel Island is considered to be one of the origins of the fictional Wild Cat Island in the 1930 book Swallows and Amazons and its sequels, by Arthur Ransome. Taqui Altounyan, sister of Roger Altounyan and inspiration for one of the characters in Swallows and Amazons, described Peel Island in her autobiography In Aleppo Once as "like a green tuffet, sitting in the water, the trees covering the rocks". The island also features in W. G. Collingwood's novel Thorstein of the Mere, A Saga of the Northmen in Lakeland. Ransome, at the age of eight, first met the Collingwoods at a family picnic on Peel Island: a chance meeting that would prove to have important consequences in Ransome's later life, with Collingwood's grandchildren providing a model for significant characters in Swallows and Amazons.

Accident

References

Islands of the Lake District
Uninhabited islands of England
Colton, Cumbria